Phichit Provincial Stadium, is a stadium located in Phichit, Thailand.  It is currently used for football matches.  The stadium holds 15,000 spectators.

External links
Stadium information

Football venues in Thailand
Sport in Phichit province
Buildings and structures in Phichit province